Greensill is a surname. Notable people with the surname include:

Angeline Greensill (born 1948), New Zealand academic and Māori activist
Bruce Greensill (1942–2007), Australian rugby union player
Lex Greensill (born 1977), Australian businessman and banker

See also
 Greensill Capital
 Greensill scandal